The 1979 season was Molde's 19th season in the second tier of Norwegian football and their first since their relegation from 1. divisjon in 1978. This season Molde competed in 2. divisjon (second tier), promotion play-offs and the Norwegian Cup.

In the league, Molde finished in 2nd position in 2. divisjon group B, seven points behind winners Lyn and qualified for promotion play-offs. Molde won promotion to the 1980 1. divisjon after winning the play-offs 7–0 on aggregate against Pors.

Molde participated in the 1979 Norwegian Cup. Molde reached the fourth round where they were eliminated by Bryne. Molde lost the fourth round 0–4 on away ground.

Squad
Source:

Friendlies

Competitions

2. divisjon

Results summary

Positions by round

League table

Promotion play-offs

Molde won the promotion play-offs and were promoted to the 1. divisjon.

Norwegian Cup

Squad statistics

Appearances and goals
Lacking information:
Appearance statistics from league games in rounds 5–9 are missing.
Two goalscorers from league games in round 7 (Stjørdals/Blink at home) and four goal scorers from round 14 (Nessegutten at home) are missing.
Appearance statistics from Norwegian Cup round 1 (against Træff) are missing.

 

|}

Goalscorers

See also
Molde FK seasons

References

External links 
rsssf.no

1979
Molde